Cicely is an herb, Myrrhis odorata

Cicely may also refer to:

 Osmorhiza, a genus of plants referred to as cicely in North America

People
 Cicely Mary Barker (1895–1973), English illustrator of books, greeting cards, and postcards noted for The Flower Fairies of the Spring
 Dame Cicely Courtneidge (1893–1980), English actress, comedian, and Dame Commander of the Order of the British Empire (DBE); granddaughter of singer and actress Cicely Nott
 Cicely Hamilton (1872–1952), English actress, feminist, journalist, writer, and, most notably, suffragist
 Cicely Mayhew (1924–2016), first British woman diplomat
 Dame Cicely Saunders (1918–2005), English nurse, physician and writer, member of the Order of Merit and DBE
 Cicely Tyson (1924–2021), African-American actress known for The Autobiography of Miss Jane Pittman, Roots, and Diary of a Mad Black Woman
 Cicely Pearl Blair (1926–2005), British dermatologist

Other
 Cicely, Alaska, the fictional setting of the television series Northern Exposure
 The Groovy Girls doll line, by Manhattan Toy, features a doll named Cicely.

See also 
 Cecily (disambiguation)
 Sicily (disambiguation)